Aaron Mason is a British racing driver currently competing in the Porsche Supercup with Martinet by Alméras. He is a two-time champion of the Volkswagen Racing Cup GB. He made his British Touring Car Championship debut in 2013, replacing James Kaye at AmDTuning.com for the Oulton Park round.

Career
In 2009, Mason, born in Doncaster, Yorkshire, entered the Volkswagen Racing Cup Great Britain, driving a Volkswagen Golf GTI Mk V for AWM Motorsport; he finished on the podium once out of his 13 races, and was classified third in the championship. He remained in the series for 2010, but slipped to fifth place, despite winning three races, and taking a further podium. He remained in the series for 2011 and 2012, finishing third both years, with four victories. He entered the series again in 2013, driving a Volkswagen Scirocco R, and took four victories early in the season; his total tally of 15 made him the most successful driver in the history of the series. In June 2013, it was announced that Mason would be driving for AmDTuning.com in the Oulton Park round of the British Touring Car Championship, as regular driver James Kaye had business commitments that prevented him from competing in the event. He took third place in the Jack Sears Trophy in the first race (21st overall), but overrevved the engine in the second, and was unable to race in the final round of the day. Shaun Hollamby, the team boss of AmDTuning.com, praised his performance, stating "He did a brilliant job when you consider he was thrown in at the deep end and there was a lot for him to get used to in a short amount of time." Following the race, he returned to the VW Racing Cup, and took the title in the final round, with his fifth victory of the season.

Racing record

Complete British Touring Car Championship results
(key) (Races in bold indicate pole position – 1 point awarded just in first race) (Races in italics indicate fastest lap – 1 point awarded all races) (* signifies that driver lead race for at least one lap – 1 point given all races)

Complete British GT Championship results
(key) (Races in bold indicate pole position) (Races in italics indicate fastest lap)

Complete Porsche Supercup results
(key) (Races in bold indicate pole position) (Races in italics indicate fastest lap)

References

Living people
Sportspeople from Doncaster
British Touring Car Championship drivers
Porsche Carrera Cup GB drivers
Aston Martin Racing drivers
Porsche Supercup drivers
1979 births
24H Series drivers